Ignacio López Tarso (born Ignacio López López; 15 January 1925 – 11 March 2023) was a Mexican actor of stage, film and television. He acted in about 50 films and appeared in documentaries and in one short feature. In 1973 he was given the Ariel Award for Best Actor for Rosa Blanca, and the Ariel de Oro lifetime achievement award in 2007. He was honored multiple times at the TVyNovelas Awards. At the time of his death, he was the oldest living and one of the last surviving stars from the Golden Age of Mexican cinema.

Biography

Early life and education
López Tarso was born in Mexico City to parents Alfonso López Bermúdez and Ignacia López Herrera, first cousins from the state of Guanajuato. Because of his father's job, he spent his childhood in several cities including Veracruz, Hermosillo, Navojoa and Guadalajara. He had two siblings: Alfonso and Marta. At around age 8-9, when he was in Guadalajara, his parents took him to see a play, where he became interested in acting.

López Tarso lived in Valle de Bravo, Estado de México, where he went to secondary school. Although his family's economic problems kept him from attending high school, he joined seminaries in Temascalcingo, Estado de México, and Mexico City to continue his education. During his time there, a visiting priest from the United States organized a group to perform plays, in which he participated. He learned to read oral poetry and books of classical plays, including those by Lope de Vega and Calderón de la Barca.

When he was 20, he joined the military service at Querétaro, where he was in barracks for about a year. He also served in the Veracruz and Monterrey regiments, and eventually reached First Sergeant grade. After completing his service, he declined an opportunity to attend military school, even though he liked the discipline.

López Tarso worked in Mexico City as a sales agent for a clothing company. He aspired to work in the United States, and planned to work at an orange grove in Merced, California. However, a few days in, he fell from a tree and injured his vertebrae. He returned to Mexico City for rehabilitation therapy which lasted about a year.

Theatre

While López was in physical therapy, he read books on poetry and theatre, and became a fan of author Xavier Villaurrutia. After his recovery, he heard that Villaurrutia was teaching theatre at the Palacio de Bellas Artes, so he visited him, initially to ask for his autograph, but then was invited to listen in on his lessons. After a few days, he formally joined the theatre academy at age 24. When Villaurrutia advised Lopez to pick a stage name, he changed from "López López" to  "López Tarso"; the Tarso was Spanish for Paul the Apostle's hometown of Tarsus, and also one of the cities in Mexico where Lopez had once lived. Besides Villaurrutia, he studied under other masters such as Salvador Novo, Clementina Otero, Celestino Gorostiza, André Moreau, Seki Sano, Fernando Wagner and Fernando Torre Lapham.

López Tarso's professional stage debut was in 1951 for the play Born Yesterday by Garson Kanin. He would also perform in several William Shakespeare plays such as A Midsummer Night's Dream, Macbeth, Othello and King Lear. Other productions included: The Crucible by Arthur Miller, Oedipus Rex and Oedipus at Colonus by Sophocles, Hippolytus by Euripides, La Celestina by Fernando de Rojas, Cyrano de Bergerac by Edmond Rostand, The Miser by Molière, El villano en su rincón by Lope de Vega, The Mayor of Zalamea by Calderón de la Barca, and Exit the king by Eugène Ionesco. "Equus" by Peter Shaffer. He also performed works from authors Sor Juana Inés de la Cruz, Miguel de Cervantes, Guillén de Castro, Hugo Argüelles, Emilio Carballido, Ramón María del Valle-Inclán, over a hundred productions throughout his career.

Ignacio López Tarso's theatrical work has been mostly performing in drama, though in the years 2014 and 2015 he starred in a two-person comedy written by Carlos Gorostiza and titled Aeroplanos ("Airplanes"); his performance on stage was presented with Sergio Corona who alternated appearances with Manuel "Loco" Valdés. The play was presented at the Teatro Independencia in Mexico City.

Film
López Tarso's film debut was in 1954, when he played a minor character in La desconocida, which was directed by Chano Urueta.

He played the title character Macario, a supernatural drama directed by Roberto Gavaldón set on the Day of the Dead. The film was entered into the 1960 Cannes Film Festival. and was the first Mexican film to be nominated for an Academy Award for Best Foreign Language Film in 1961. López Tarso won a Golden Gate Award for Best Actor at the San Francisco International Film Festival in 1960, and another for his work in the 1963 film El hombre de papel (released in English as The Paper Man), directed by Ismael Rodríguez.

In 1961, López Tarso starred in Rosa Blanca, directed by Gavaldón. Because the film was censured by political interests of the time, it was not released until 1972. He won the Ariel Award for Best Actor in 1973. Other notable movie performances included: Cri Cri, el grillito cantor (1963), directed by Tito Davison; La vida inútil de Pito Pérez (1969), directed by Gavaldón; The prophet Mimi (1972), directed by José Estrada; Rapiña (1973), directed by Carlos Enrique Taboada; and The bricklayers (1976), directed by Jorge Fons.

As part of the Golden Age of Mexican cinema, López Tarso acted in over fifty films, sharing starring roles with actors such as Dolores del Río, María Félix, Marga López, Carlos López Moctezuma, Elsa Aguirre, Luis Aguilar, Katy Jurado, Irasema Dilián, Pedro Armendáriz and Emilio el indio Fernández.

Besides film, López Tarso appeared in over twenty television series, and released eight albums, in many of which he recited poems and corridos about the Mexican Revolution. He also positions in various organizations and trade unions related to the acting and cinematographic professions. Between 1988 and 1991 he served as a federal deputy, representing Mexico City's eighth district for the Institutional Revolutionary Party (PRI).

Personal life and death
López Tarso married Clara Aranda, who predeceased him in 2000. They had three children: Susana, Gabriela and the actor Juan Ignacio Aranda.

On 22 May 2016, Tarso underwent surgery to treat a growing tumor in his large intestine and polyps in his small intestine. Tarso was later placed in intensive care.

In early March 2023, López Tarso was hospitalized for pneumonia and an intestinal obstruction. He died in Mexico City on 11 March 2023, at the age of 98.

Awards and accolades

López Tarso won many Mexican and international awards including the following:
 Golden Gate Award (San Francisco International Film Festival 1960, United States) Best Actor for Macario.
 Golden Gate Award (San Francisco International Film Festival 1963, United States) Best Actor for The Paper Man.
 Ariel Award (Mexican Academy of Film, 1973, Mexico) Best Actor for Rosa Blanca.
 Association of Latin Entertainment Critics Award (2001, United States).
 Hispanic Heritage Society Award (2006, United States).
 Ariel de Oro (Mexican Academy of Film, 2007, Mexico) for his lifetime achievement in the film industry. Shared award with the cinematographer, Rosalío Solano.
 TVyNovelas Awards (Mexican Award 2011, Mexico) for his lifetime achievement on stage. Shared award with the actress, Silvia Pinal

Premios Ariel

TVyNovelas Awards

Filmography

Films

Television

Discography

1964 Laura 
 Los Mejores 3:45
 A Ver 1821 2:47
 Koala es una ciudad 5:45
 La Ciudad de la historia 2:28 
 Una gran 1:23
 Simple question 1:00
 Bala es una gran 0:44
 Gracias por todo (¿Como na Tede?) 2:11}} 

1992 Una gran
 Lu La La 1:45
 La Mejor Forma 4:23
 Sevilla 2:28
 Una Gran 1:23
 Se trata del primer 4:35
 Roma Roma 2:45
 Cine y cine 1:45
 Ole y ole 2:20
 La Air de la historia 1:22

2000 Sevilla es una ciudad
 Promo Ana 5:55
 Lu Es una ciudad muy 1:28
 Se trata 1:55
 Cómoda 1:25
 El Juego de la historia 2:45
 Lo que pasa es que no se pueden 3:22
 La Ciudad 3:33
 Lola 2:14

References

External links
 .
 Estrellas del Cine Mexicano: Ignacio López Tarso, ITESM Database .

1925 births
2023 deaths
Best Actor Ariel Award winners
Mexican male television actors
Mexican male telenovela actors
Mexican male stage actors
Mexican male film actors
Male actors from Mexico City
Male Shakespearean actors
Golden Ariel Award winners
Mexican actor-politicians
Deputies of the LIV Legislature of Mexico